Rinzia icosandra, commonly known as the Recherche mainland rinzia, is a plant species of the family Myrtaceae endemic to Western Australia.

The shrub is found along the south coast of the Goldfields-Esperance region of Western Australia including islands of the Recherche Archipelago.

References

icosandra
Endemic flora of Western Australia
Myrtales of Australia
Rosids of Western Australia
Taxa named by George Bentham
Taxa named by Barbara Lynette Rye